Tarzan Milošević (born 28 July 1954 in Bijelo Polje, FPR Yugoslavia) is a Montenegrin politician, a member of the ruling Democratic Party of Socialists of Montenegro.

Formerly the mayor of Bijelo Polje, from 2011 Milošević became Montenegro's Minister for Agriculture and Rural Development (Ministar poljoprivrede i ruralnog razvoja), a post he held until 2012. 

In 2019, he was appointed as the Montenegrin ambassador to Serbia.

References

External links 

Government profile

1954 births
Montenegrin politicians
Living people
Democratic Party of Socialists of Montenegro politicians
People from Bijelo Polje
Serbs of Montenegro
Agriculture ministers of Montenegro